No Man's Land is the third studio album by Lene Lovich, released on 12 November 1982 by Stiff Records. It is her last album to be released on the Stiff Records label. The album is produced by Lovich and Les Chappell. It contains songs from her previously released extended play, New Toy, since the album was planned to be already released in 1981, but was postponed following the disagreements with the record company.

The lead single, "It's You, Only You (Mein Schmerz)", reached number 25 on the Billboard Hot Dance Club Songs and number 51 on the Mainstream Rock chart. It also peaked at number 68 on the UK Singles Chart. "Blue Hotel" was released as the next single.

After its release, No Man's Land received mixed reviews from the music critics and was a less commercial success compared to her previous albums, Stateless (1978) and Flex (1979). It peaked at number 188 on the Billboard 200.

Track listing

Personnel
Lene Lovich – vocals, saxophone, trumpet
Les Chappell – guitar, synthesizer, vocals
Jeff Smith – synthesizer
Mark Heyward-Chaplin – bass
Bogdan Wiczling – drums
Justin Hildreth – drums
Dean Klevatt – piano
Nick Plytas – keyboards
Thomas Dolby – synthesizer on "Rocky Road"
Jimme O'Neill – rhythm synthesizer, vocals on "Sister Video"
Alvin Clark, Bryan Evans, Damian Korner, Gordon Fordyce, Jon Walls, Martin Rushent, Peter Rackham, Steve Nye
Technical
Recording Engineer - Jon Walls
Produced by Lene Lovich, Les Chappell
Remixed by Bob Clearmountain with Lene Lovich, Les Chappell and Dick Wingate

Notes

References

External links
[ No Man's Land] at AllMusic

Lene Lovich albums
1982 albums
Stiff Records albums